Testacella scutulum is an air-breathing, carnivorous land slug, a terrestrial gastropod mollusk in the family Testacellidae, the shelled slugs.

Like other species in the genus, this European slug eats earthworms, spends most of its life underground, and is rarely seen.

Distribution
This species is known to occur in a number of European countries and islands including:
 Great Britain
 Ireland
 Spain
 Croatia
 Italy and Sicily
 Canary Islands
 Switzerland
 and other areas

Description
This slug, like others in the family, has a small shell which is situated towards the rear of the animal. The specific name means "shield", a reference to the shape of the shell.

The animal is yellow with black or brown spots. The foot fringe and sole are usually orange. Thelateral grooves join before reaching their common origin at the front edge of themantle. The shell is  narrower than in Testacella haliotidea and nearly triangular; flattened, sometimes concave, outer margin of the aperture sharply truncate and without angle at the columella. 
Size:Animal 8–12 cm long, shell 6-7 (length) x 3.5-4.5 (width) mm

References

External links

Testacella scutulum at Animalbase taxonomy,short description, distribution, biology,status (threats), images 
 Photo of Testacella scutulum
 Photo of Testacella scutulum eating an earthworm

Testacellidae
Gastropods described in 1821
Taxa named by George Brettingham Sowerby I